Khalid Al-Ghannam (born 7 November 2000), is a Saudi Arabian professional footballer who plays as a winger for Saudi Professional League side Al-Fateh on loan from Al-Nassr.

Career
Al-Ghannam started his career at the youth teams of Al-Qadsiah. On 22 January 2019, Al-Ghannam signed his first professional contract with the club. On 19 April 2019, he made his first-team debut in the 2–0 loss against Al-Batin. On 19 August 2019, Al-Ghannam signed a contract extension with Al-Qadsiah, keeping him at the club until 2024. On 29 January 2020, Al-Ghannam left his boyhood club and signed a 5-year contract with Pro League champions Al-Nassr. The reported fee was SAR20 million, in addition to Faraj Al-Ghushayan joining Al-Qadsiah on loan. He made 16 appearances for Al-Qadsiah in all competitions and scored once against Al-Bukayriyah.

On 28 January 2023, Al-Ghannam joined Al-Fateh on a six-month loan.

Career statistics

Club

Honours

Club
Al-Nassr
Saudi Super Cup: 2020

International
Saudi Arabia U20
AFC U-19 Championship: 2018

References

External links

2000 births
Living people
Saudi Arabian footballers
Saudi Arabia youth international footballers
Saudi Arabia international footballers
Saudi Professional League players
Saudi First Division League players
Al-Qadsiah FC players
Al Nassr FC players
Al-Fateh SC players
Association football wingers
Olympic footballers of Saudi Arabia
Footballers at the 2020 Summer Olympics
People from Khobar